Belgrade is a town in Zululand District Municipality in the KwaZulu-Natal province of South Africa.It is located in the North of KwaZulu-Natal and it is a
Perfect place for agricultural practices. It consists of 6 sections with an increasing informal settlement throughout the community.

References

Populated places in the uPhongolo Local Municipality